Roberto Tavola (born 7 August 1957, in Pescate) is a retired Italian professional footballer who played as a midfielder.

Honours
Juventus
 Serie A champion: 1981–82, 1983–84.

1957 births
Living people
Italian footballers
Serie A players
Serie B players
Atalanta B.C. players
Juventus F.C. players
Cagliari Calcio players
S.S. Lazio players
Reggina 1914 players
S.P.A.L. players
U.S. Catanzaro 1929 players
Association football midfielders
S.S. Ischia Isolaverde players
Asti Calcio F.C. players